Babina is a cantonment town in Jhansi district in the state of Uttar Pradesh, India. Shree Rajeev Singh Parichha is MLA of Babina constituency.

Etymology
It is said that Babina is an acronym for "British Army Base in North Asia". While this has been endorsed by the Cantonment Board of Babina, it appears to be a backronym that has been endorsed without due verification. Contrary to what the alleged anacronym suggests, the cantonment at Babina had no association with the British Raj, and was opened in 1959, 12 years after the British left India. Furthermore, India is considered to be a part of South Asia, not North Asia as the acronym suggests. This suggests that the popular anacronym is very likely a modern invention and is not based on factual evidence.

Indian Army
Jhansi district is the headquarters of the 31st Indian Armoured Division, stationed at Jhansi-Babina. It is an armored division which has equipment like M3 Lee [Historian] and M4 Sherman tanks [Historian]. There has been a joint exercise from 1 to 30 Mar 2012 with the Singaporean Army at Jhansi witnessed by the President of India, Pratibha Patil.
              And 
Indra exercise 2019 between Indian and Russian Army at Babina Battlefield OVER 25 KMS Long Range.
 
The Indian Army T-90 tanks as well as 124 'Arjun' and 2,400 older T-72 tanks India has already procured additional laser-guided Invar missiles & IAF operates & flies attack Helicopters like the Mil Mi-25/Mi-35 and HAL Rudra the Indian Air Force, but under the operational control of the Army & play a major role to support the armoured columns and infantry.
 
Or 
 
In Babina (jhansi), Russian soldiers are practicing with Indian Army's T-90 tanks, BMPs and Bofors. Yesterday, with the T-90 tank, the Indian Army hit the target with accurate aim. Combat Vehicle BMP also fired with them. In the UN mission, soldiers inside the BMP destroy the enemy by approaching their target. Russia has given T90 and BMP to India. Both the armies are conducting exercises under the supervision of Major General PS Minhas, GOC of 31 Armed from the Indian side and his counterpart from the Russian side.
 
During this, the soldiers of both the army carried out their action in the house clearance (killing the terrorists when they entered a house). Earlier, 10 paratroopers were landed in the range by helicopter. He climbed a building and jumped down. As soon as he entered the house downstairs, he carried out the action of killing the terrorists one after the other.
 
The exercise between the armies of India and Russia at the Babina Firing Range in Jhansi is different. The soldiers of the Russian army do not know English. They speak and understand only Russian language. To make dialogue between the army of India and Russia, both the armies have that jawan and There are officers who work as translators. Due to this, while Indians are getting knowledge of Russian language, the Russian army also has Hindi speaking officers. Russian soldiers take part in sports, but in Babina they wake up in the morning and do yoga.

Geography
2nd biggest cantt of asia
It has an average elevation of 303 metres (994 feet).

Places to visit:
Sukma Dukma Dam is a very beautiful one. This dam is located in Babina Jhansi city of Uttar Pradesh. One of the better places to visit near Jhansi during the rainy season. Sukma Dukma Dam is a British era dam, which was built in the first five year plan. This dam is 800 meters in length. The right time to visit this dam is during the rainy season. Because in the rainy season, the dam is completely filled with water and overflowing the water falls on the dam, which looks like a beautiful waterfall. Most of the people come to enjoy the beauty of the dam during the rainy season. Here is a very nice place for picnic. the dam is built on the Betwa river.

Demographics
As of the 2011 Census of India, Babina had a population of 35,165. Males constitute 62% of the population and females 38%. Babina has an average literacy rate of 73%, higher than the national average of 59.5%; with 69% of the males and 31% of females literate. 13% of the population is under 6 years of age.

References

Articles containing potentially dated statements from 2001
All articles containing potentially dated statements
Cities and towns in Jhansi district